Lutz Gerresheim (born 19 September 1958 – 10 March 1980) was a German football midfielder.

References

External links
 

1958 births
1980 deaths
German footballers
Bundesliga players
2. Bundesliga players
SC Westfalia Herne players
VfL Bochum players
Sportspeople from Bochum
Association football midfielders
Footballers from North Rhine-Westphalia